This event should not be confused with the Powder River Expedition (1865).
The Big Horn Expedition, or Bighorn Expedition, was a military operation of the United States Army against the Sioux, and Cheyenne Indians in Wyoming Territory and Montana Territory. Although soldiers destroyed one Cheyenne and Oglala Sioux village, the expedition solidified Lakota Sioux and northern Cheyenne resistance against the United States attempt to force them to sell the Black Hills and live on a reservation, beginning the Great Sioux War of 1876.

Background 
The Treaty of Fort Laramie (1868) granted the Lakota Sioux and their northern Cheyenne allies a reservation, including the Black Hills, in Dakota Territory and a large area of "unceded territory" in what became Montana and Wyoming. Both areas were for the exclusive use of the Indians, and whites except for government officials, were forbidden to trespass.  In August, 1874, soldiers of the Black Hills Expedition under Lieutenant Colonel George A. Custer confirmed the discovery of gold in the Black Hills. This caused the United States to attempt to buy the Hills from the Sioux.  The U.S. ordered all bands of Lakota and Cheyenne to come to the Indian agencies on the reservation by January 31, 1876 to negotiate the sale. Some of the bands did not comply and when the deadline of January 31 passed, the Commissioner of Indian Affairs, John Q. Smith, wrote that "without the receipt of any news of Sitting Bull's submission, I see no reason why...military operations against him should not commence at once." On February 8, 1876, General Phillip Sheridan telegraphed Generals George R. Crook and Alfred H. Terry, ordering them to undertake winter campaigns against the "hostiles".

March 1-3 
In bitterly cold weather, Brigadier General George Crook, commander of the Department of the Platte, marched north from Fort Fetterman near Douglas, Wyoming on March 1, 1876. General Crook's objective was to strike against the Indians while they were at their most vulnerable in their winter camps. Sitting Bull, Crazy Horse, and their followers were thought to be on the Powder, Tongue, or Rosebud rivers. Crook's force consisted of 883 men, including ten companies of United States cavalry, and two companies of infantry, along with civilian packers, scouts, guides, and a newspaper reporter, Robert Edmund Strahorn of Denver's Rocky Mountain News.  Crook's highly valued chief scout was Frank Grouard, who had lived among the Lakota and spoke their language.

Cattle herd skirmish 
In the early morning hours of March 3, 1876 north of Fort Fetterman, Indian warriors attacked the Big Horn Expedition's Cattle herd, numbering over 200 animals. The two herders fired at the warriors, and the Indians fired back. One of the government civilian employees, cattle herder John Wright was severely wounded by a bullet. The warriors then drove off and captured most of the cattle. Wright died of wounds received in the fight on March 28, 1876.

March 4-5 
The soldiers had to heat their forks in the coals of fires to prevent the tines from freezing to their tongues. A blizzard on March 5 deposited over a foot of snow and significantly delayed Crook's progress. Temperatures fell so low that the thermometers could not record the cold. Crook's column slowly followed the Bozeman Trail north to Old Fort Reno, reaching it on March 5. The fort had been abandoned by the army eight years earlier. The expedition establish its supply base near the abandoned post and Crook ordered that the wagons be left at the depot. The Infantry accompanying the column, Companies C and I of the 4th U.S. Infantry, under the command of Captain Edwin M. Coates would serve as the station's guard. That evening, the expedition camped on the east bank of the Powder River opposite the site of the fort.

Fort Reno skirmish 
By 8:00 p.m. on March 5, 1876, the soldiers' pickets were on duty and the camp was asleep, when Native American warriors hiding near the east end of the camp suddenly fired on the infantry picket lines. The soldiers on guard answered their fire, but being a dark night, all either side could see were the flashes of gunfire. The sleeping camp quickly awoke and many of the soldiers went toward the picket lines. In the firefight that ensued, Private James M. Slavey of Company I, 4th Infantry was wounded in the cheek by a bullet. The skirmish lasted for less than an hour. One aspect that made the engagement rare was that it was a night battle, which was not a common event during the American Indian Wars.

March 6–16 
On March 6, the Bighorn expedition continued north, and on March 7 the five cavalry battalions set out toward the confluence of Prairie Dog Creek and the Tongue River. After reaching that point on March 12, the ten cavalry companies rode first down the Tongue, then to the headwaters of Otter Creek, reaching it on March 16. On the 16th, scout Frank Grouard spotted two Oglala Lakota warriors observing the soldiers. Because of this, Grouard believed that the Oglala Lakota camp of the war chief Crazy Horse might be nearby. This was reported to Crook, and at 5 p.m. on March 16, he divided his command and sent Colonel Joseph J. Reynolds (a West Point classmate of President Ulysses S. Grant, and a combat veteran of both the Mexican–American War, and Civil War) on a night march with about 379 men, supplying them with rations for one day, and following the trail of the two Oglala's southeast toward the Powder River. General Crook kept with him about 300 of the expedition's men and the pack train, with which he planned to rendezvous with Reynolds at the mouth of Lodge Pole Creek on the 17th. During the night Frank Grouard and the other scouts led Reynolds's advance and followed the two warriors's trail in the snow. It led to what they were looking for, a Cheyenne and Lakota Sioux Indian village, which they described as containing more than 100 lodges on the west bank of Powder River. The scouts immediately reported this information back to Colonel Reynolds.

Battle of Powder River 

The village, however, was somewhat further north than anticipated, with the result that initially only Captain James Egan's 2nd Cavalry Company K, of 47 men, including Second Lieutenant John G. Bourke, charged into the village from the south, while the other companies were delayed by the distance and rough terrain. The soldiers were under fire for approximately five hours when, at about 2:30 p.m., with the destruction of the village complete, Reynolds ordered his soldiers to withdraw. Over 700 Indian ponies had been captured. In his premature haste to withdraw, the command left behind the bodies of its three dead soldiers, with one in the village, and two at a field hospital as well as Private Lorenzo E. Ayers, who was badly wounded and subsequently killed by vengeful Indians. The men made their way across to the east side of the frozen Powder River, withdrawing south.

Although the Indians suffered only two to three killed and one to three wounded during the battle, they lost most of their property and, in the words of the Cheyenne warrior Wooden Leg, were "rendered very poor."  The people walked several days to reach the Oglala Sioux village of Crazy Horse farther north near the Little Powder River, where they were given shelter and food. On the way, several Cheyenne froze to death. The army stated that the village consisted of about 104 lodges, including tipis and wikiups, while Cheyenne accounts said the village had about 40-65 tipis, and about 50 other structures. Therefore, around a hundred total structures made up the Indian village that day. The number of warriors involved in the battle numbered between 100 and 250, while there were about 379 U. S. soldiers and civilians present.

March 18–26 
Early in the morning of March 18, the Cheyenne recaptured over 500 of their ponies, but Colonel Reynolds ordered his men not to pursue. At approximately 1:30 p.m. that day, Crook's command rejoined Reynolds with the pack train, and the six companies were finally able to collect their rations and blankets. The reunited column returned to the supply base at Old Fort Reno, where the wounded soldiers were placed in wagons, and Captain Coates's companies of the 4th Infantry rejoined the Big Horn Expedition after two weeks of separation. On March 26, 1876, the entire command, except for the four soldiers killed on March 17, returned to Fort Fetterman, Wyoming Territory, ending the 26-day campaign.

Aftermath
The command suffered more than 79 casualties from various causes, including 4 killed, 8 wounded, 1 injured in an accident, and over 66 frostbitten. Colonel Reynolds was accused of dereliction of duty for failing to properly support the first charge at Powder River with his entire command; for burning the captured supplies, food, blankets, buffalo robes, and ammunition instead of keeping them for army use; and most of all, for losing hundreds of the captured horses. In January, 1877, his court-martial at Cheyenne, Wyoming Territory found Reynolds guilty of all three charges. He was sentenced to suspension from rank and command for one year. Reynolds's friend and West Point classmate, President Ulysses S. Grant, remitted the sentence, but he never served again. Joseph J. Reynolds retired on disability leave on June 25, 1877, exactly one year after the culminating battle of the Great Sioux War at the Little Bighorn. Crook's and Reynolds's failed expedition and their inability to seriously damage the Lakota and Cheyenne probably encouraged Indian resistance to the demands of the United States.

Casualties 
Native Americans

Killed in action-
 Eagle Chief, Northern Cheyenne, March 17.
 Whirlwind, Northern Cheyenne, March 17.

Wounded in action-
 Braided Locks, Northern Cheyenne, March 17, "one cheek furrowed by a bullet".
 unknown warrior, Northern Cheyenne, March 17 "forearm badly shattered".

United States Army

Killed in action-
 Private Peter Dowdy, Company E, 3rd Cavalry, March 17.
 Private George Schneider, Company K, 2nd Cavalry, March 17.
 Private Michael I. McCannon, Company F, 3rd Cavalry, March 17.
 Private Lorenzo E. Ayers, Company M, 3rd Cavalry, March 17.

Mortally wounded-
 Cattle Herder John Wright, mortally wounded March 3, died of wounds March 28.

Wounded in action-
 Private James M. Slavey, Company I, 4th Infantry, March 5.
 First Lieutenant William C. Rawolle, Company E, 2nd Cavalry, March 17.
 Sergeant Charles Kaminski, Company M, 3rd Cavalry, March 17.
 Corporal John Lang, Company E, 2nd Cavalry, March 17.
 Farrier Patrick Goings, Company K, 2nd Cavalry, March 17.
 Private John Droege. Company K, 2nd Cavalry, March 17.
 Private Edward Eagan, Company K, 2nd Cavalry, March 17.

Injured-

 Corporal John H. Moore, Company D, 3rd Cavalry, March 9, crushed by horse and severely injured

Frostbitten-

 Second Lieutenant John G. Bourke, Company L, 3rd Cavalry
 65 additional soldiers

Orders of battle
Native Americans, Chief's Two Moon, He Dog, Little Coyote (Little Wolf), and Old Bear.  Between 100 and 250 warriors.

United States Army

Big Horn Expedition, March 1–26, 1876, Brigadier General George R. Crook and Colonel Joseph J. Reynolds, commanding.

United States Army, Colonel Joseph J. Reynolds, 3rd United States Cavalry Regiment, in command. Brigadier General George Crook following as an observer.

 2nd United States Cavalry Regiment.
 Company A, First Lieutenant Daniel C. Pearson.
 Company B, Captain James T. Peale.
 Company E, 53 men, First Lieutenant William C. Rawolle.
 Company I, 56 men, Captain Henry E. Noyes.
 Company K, 47 men, Captain James Egan.
 3rd United States Cavalry Regiment.
 Company A, First Lieutenant Joseph Lawson
 Company D, First Lieutenant William W. Robinson.
 Company E, 69 men, First Lieutenant John B. Johnson.
 Company F, 68 men, Captain Alexander Moore.
 Company H, 1 man, Second Lieutenant William W. Robinson, Jr.
 Company L, 1 man, Second Lieutenant John G. Bourke.
 Company M, 68 men, Captain Anson Mills.
 4th United States Infantry Regiment.
 Company C, Captain Edwin M. Coates
 Company I, Captain Samuel P. Ferris
 Scouts, Guides, Herders, Packers, Wagoners, Ambulance Employees, Unattached Soldiers, and Civilians, 191 men.
 Commissioned Officers......................................30
 Enlisted Soldiers..............................................662
 Scouts, Guides, Herders...................................35
 5 Pack Trains, Chief Packer and employees....62
 Wagon Train employees...................................89
 Ambulance employees........................................5
 Aggregate......................................................883 men

Officers of the expedition
 Brigadier General George R. Crook, Commander, Department of the Platte
 Colonel Joseph Jones Reynolds, Field and Staff, 3rd Cavalry
 Major Thaddeus Harlan Stanton, Paymaster, Chief of Scouts
 Assistant Surgeon Curtis E. Munn, Medical Service, Department of the Platte
 Acting Assistant Surgeon Charles R. Stephens, Medical Service, Department of the Platte
 Acting Assistant Surgeon John Ridgely, Medical Service, Department of the Platte 
 Captain Anson Mills, Company M, 3rd Cavalry, Commander, 1st Battalion
 Captain William Hawley, Company A, 3rd Cavalry, Commander, 2nd Battalion
 Captain Henry Erastus Noyes, Company I, 2nd Cavalry, Commander, 3rd Battalion
 Captain Thomas Bull Dewees, Company A, 2nd Cavalry, Commander, 4th Battalion
 Captain Alexander Moore, Company F, 3rd Cavalry, Commander, 5th Battalion
 Captain Edwin Mortimer Coates, Company C, 4th Infantry, Commander, 6th Battalion
 Captain Samuel P. Ferris, Company I, 4th Infantry
 Captain James T. Peale, Company B, 2nd Cavalry
 Captain James "Teddy" Egan, Company K, 2nd Cavalry
 First Lieutenant William Charles Rawolle (wounded), Company E, 2nd Cavalry
 First Lieutenant Martin E. O'Brien, Company A, 2nd Cavalry
 First Lieutenant Christopher T. Hall, Company I, 2nd Cavalry
 First Lieutenant Joseph Lawson, Company A, 3rd Cavalry
 First Lieutenant William Wallace Robinson, Company D, 3rd Cavalry
 First Lieutenant John Burgess Johnson, Company E, 3rd Cavalry
 First Lieutenant Augustus Choutea Paul, Company M, 3rd Cavalry
 Second Lieutenant John Gregory Bourke, Aide-de-camp to General George Crook, Company L, 3rd Cavalry
 Second Lieutenant Charles Morton, Acting Regimental Adjutant and Quartermaster of Cavalry, Company A, 3rd Cavalry
 Second Lieutenant Charles W. Mason, Company I, 4th Infantry
 Second Lieutenant Daniel Crosby Pearson, Company A, 2nd Cavalry
 Second Lieutenant Frank U. Robinson
 Second Lieutenant Frederick William Sibley, Company E, 2nd Cavalry
 Second Lieutenant Joseph Lawson, Company A, 3rd Cavalry
 Second Lieutenant Bainbridge Reynolds, Company F, 3rd Cavalry

In popular culture 
In 1951, Hollywood produced a fictional movie loosely based upon the Battle of Powder River of the Big Horn Expedition, starring Van Heflin, Yvonne De Carlo, Jack Oakie, and Rock Hudson. The movie was released in the United States under the name Tomahawk, and entitled Battle of Powder River in the United Kingdom, and elsewhere.

Further reading 
 Vaughn, J. W., The Reynolds Campaign On Powder River, University of Oklahoma Press, 1961.
 Dillon, Richard H., North American Indian Wars 1983. 
 Greene, Jerome A. (editor), Battles and Skirmishes of the Great Sioux War, 1876-1877: The Military View, University of Oklahoma Press, 1993. . 
 Marquis, Thomas, Wooden Leg: A Warrior Who Fought Custer. 1920
 Voices from the Western Frontier

References 

1876 in the United States
Montana Territory